Live in Austin, TX may refer to:
Live in Austin, TX (The Black Keys album)
Live in Austin, TX (ProjeKct Three album)